"You're My Better Half" is a song co-written and recorded by Australian country music artist Keith Urban. It was released in October 2004 as the second single from his 2004 album Be Here. The song peaked at number 2 on the U.S. Billboard Hot Country Songs charts.  Urban wrote this song with John Shanks.

Critical reception
Deborah Evans Price of Billboard magazine reviewed the song favorably, calling the production "light and breezy." She goes on to call it an "engaging performance" and saying that the lyric "paints a sweet portrait of domestic bliss, the kind of love that makes it easier to endure a hard day at work because of the prize waiting at home."

Music video
The music video was directed by Trey Fanjoy, and premiered on CMT on October 29, 2004.

Charts
"You're My Better Half" debuted at number 50 on the U.S. Billboard Hot Country Singles & Tracks chart for the week of 30 October 2004.

Weekly charts

Year-end charts

Certifications

References

2004 singles
Keith Urban songs
Music videos directed by Trey Fanjoy
Song recordings produced by Dann Huff
Songs written by John Shanks
Songs written by Keith Urban
Capitol Records Nashville singles
2004 songs